The Ponghwa Chemical Factory ("Torchlight Chemical Factory") is the larger of North Korea's two oil refineries. It is located in Sinŭiju, on the river border with Dandong in China, and originally was supplied with crude by rail from the Daqing oilfields in China. The other refinery is the Sŭngri Refinery on North Korea's Tumen River border with Russia.

In 2019 NK News reported that to the refinery was expanded with Fluid catalytic cracking being implemented into the refinery, likely increasing production of gasoline and diesel.

References

Chemical companies of North Korea
China–North Korea relations
Chinese foreign aid
Oil refineries in North Korea